Mónica López may refer to:

 Mónica López (actress) (born 1969), Spanish actress
 Mònica López (born 1975), Spanish meteorologist
 Mónica López (politician), Argentine politician